P. Folsom was the head coach of the University of Maine's football team in 1895 and compiled a 1–4 record.

Head coaching record

References

Year of birth missing
Year of death missing
Maine Black Bears football coaches